The Matzuva attack was a terrorist attack on March 12, 2002 in which two Islamic Jihad militants who infiltrated Israel from Lebanon opened fire on civilian vehicles traveling on the Shlomi-Matzuva road. Six Israelis were killed in the attack and one injured.

The attack 
On March 12, 2002 two Islamic Jihad militants crossed the border, reached a mountain overlooking the Shlomi-Matzuva road, and began firing small arms and throwing hand grenades at vehicles traveling on the road, including a civilian commuter bus.

Five Israeli civilians and an Israeli army officer were killed and a member of Kibbutz Matzuva was injured.

The attackers were killed in battle with Israeli security forces.

Fatalities

The perpetrators 
Initially Israeli intelligence officials believed that the attack was organized by Hezbollah, although Hezbollah did not confirm this. Following the signing of the trade agreement between Lebanon and the European Union in 2002, Hezbollah had agreed not to commit any attacks across the international border between Israel and Lebanon. In 2004, Islamic Jihad took responsibility for the attack. In May 2006, Mahmoud al-Majzoub, leader of the Palestinian Islamic Jihad at that time, was blown up in his car in Sidon. There were speculations that the hit was a response to the 2002 Matzuva attack, but Israel has not taken responsibility for al-Majzoub's death.

See also
 2000–2006 Shebaa Farms conflict

References

External links
 MIDEAST TURMOIL: LEBANON FRONT; Fatal Attack Shatters Israeli Border Town's Calm - published in The New York Times on March 14, 2002
 Mother, daughter from Kibbutz Hanita among ambush victims - published in the Jerusalem Post on March 13, 2002
 Terrorists slay 6 in Galilee attack. Area residents confined to homes - published in the Jerusalem Post on March 13, 2002

Mass murder in 2002
Terrorist attacks attributed to Palestinian militant groups
Spree shootings in Israel
Terrorist incidents in Israel in 2002
March 2002 events in Asia